Alessio Proietti Colonna (born 7 May 1998) is an Italian swimmer.

Proietti Colonna is an athlete of the Gruppo Sportivo della Marina Militare.

Biography
He competed in the 4×200 m freestyle relay event at the 2018 European Aquatics Championships, winning the bronze medal.

References

1998 births
Living people
Italian male swimmers
Italian male freestyle swimmers
European Aquatics Championships medalists in swimming
Swimmers of Marina Militare
Swimmers at the 2015 European Games
European Games competitors for Italy
Universiade medalists in swimming
20th-century Italian people
21st-century Italian people
Mediterranean Games competitors for Italy
Swimmers at the 2022 Mediterranean Games
Universiade silver medalists for Italy
Medalists at the 2019 Summer Universiade